Abakumovo is a rural locality (a selo) in Tyrnovskoye Rural Settlement of Pronsky District, Ryazan Oblast, Russia. The  population was 141 as of 2010. There are 5 streets.

Geography 
Abakumovo is located 17 km north of Pronsk (the district's administrative centre) by road. Popovka is the nearest rural locality.

References 

Rural localities in Ryazan Oblast